The 2015 Rally Italia Sardegna, held on Sardinia, was the sixth round of the 2015 World Rally Championship season.
Sébastien Ogier obtained its fourth victory in this season.

Entry list

Report
The rally began with a surprising Martin Prokop winning the Super Special Stage of Cagliari, followed by Dani Sordo (penalized for false start) and Mikkelsen. On the second day, new surprise with Hayden Paddon winning the first Friday 3 sections, and at the end of SS 4 led the rally with 25.3 s lead over Latvala and Ogier on 27.5. In the remaining stages, Paddon controlled the pace, but a slight touch on the last stage reduced the advantage  to only 8.8 s, now on Ogier who had exceeded his teammate. Dani Sordo was forced to leave after booting a wheel while Neuville suffered from problems such as turbo and handbrake and finished 6th. Meeke gave-up at SS 2 and Kubica did the same on the next.

It was necessary to reach the SS 17 and a spinning from Paddon for a VW take the rally lead. Ostberg was third, despite having traveled 20 km with a slow tyre leakage, having won 2 PEC before having new slow tyre leakage in the last SS. In this day Mikkelsen (lost a wheel) Sordo (lack of gas pressure), Kubica (3 holes and a stuck gearbox) and Tänak (gearbox jammed when he was 3rd place) dropped out while there were many hardships to Neuville (whipping-top, turbo and steering problems and 40s penalty) and Latvala (hole and crashed shock absorber for 2 sections). At the end of the day Ogier had a huge advantage over Paddon (2m13s) while Ostberg was 3 to 3m25s and Neuville 4th at 3m57s.

For the last day the attention was concentrated in the fight for the last podium spot between Ostberg and Neuville. An outwit from Ostberg (dropped to 5) delivered the 3rd to the Belgian. The power-stage was completely dominated by VW: Ogier, Latvala and Mikkelsen.

Overall standings

Special stages

Power Stage

References

Sardegna
Rally Italia Sardegna
Rally di Sardegna